The commune of Rutegama is a commune of Muramvya Province in central-western Burundi. The capital lies at Rutegama.

References

Communes of Burundi
Muramvya Province